Kamunyaka is a settlement in Thika District, Central Province, Kenya. It is next to the Kieni Forest.

It is part of Githobokini ward of Gatundu North Constituency and Thika County Council. It is a mostly Kikuyu-speaking community. Kamunyaka is an independent sub-location made up of several villages:

Kageche - middle between Kihombi and Kiawangware
Murundi - middle
Kiawangware - far east
Kihombi - middle between Kageche and Murundi
Mucerere - right before Murundi
Murundi - right before Mucerere
Munyawa - far west (end)
Kamithunu - next to Kamunyaka shopping Center 
Kianguruwe

References 

Populated places in Central Province (Kenya)